The 1965 Asian Basketball Confederation Championship for Men were held in Kuala Lumpur, Malaysia.

Preliminary round

Group A

Group B

Final round

Classification 7th–10th

Championship

Final standing

Awards

References
 Results
 archive.fiba.com

Asia Championship, 1960
1965
B
B
ABC Championship
ABC